Rabinow is a surname. Notable people with the surname include:

 Jacob Rabinow
 Paul Rabinow

See also
 Rabin
 Rabinowitz (surname)

Slavic-language surnames
East Slavic-language surnames
Jewish surnames
Yiddish-language surnames